Nebraska Highway 62 is a highway in southeastern Nebraska. The west terminus of the western segment of Nebraska Highway 62 is at Nebraska Highway 50 south of Tecumseh, while its eastern terminus is at Nebraska Highway 105. The west terminus of the eastern segment of Nebraska Highway 62 is at U.S. Highway 75 west of Stella, while its eastern terminus is at Nebraska Highway 67 east of Shubert.

Route description

Western segment
The western segment of Nebraska Highway 62 begins at Nebraska Highway 50 south of Tecumseh.  It goes east through farmland, crosses the Big Nemaha River and meets S-49B, a spur road into Elk Creek.  It then continues east to Nebraska Highway 105 and ends in southwestern Nemaha County.

Eastern segment
The eastern segment of Nebraska Highway 62 begins at U.S. Highway 75 west of Stella.  It continues east through farmland to Stella and then Shubert, and ends at Nebraska Highway 67.

Major intersections

Western segment

Eastern segment

References

External links

 Nebraska Roads: NE 61-80

062
Transportation in Johnson County, Nebraska
Transportation in Nemaha County, Nebraska
Transportation in Richardson County, Nebraska